Fakhr al-Dawla Shah-Ghazi was the Baduspanid ruler (ustandar) of Rustamdar from 1360 to 1379. He is notable for sponsoring the composition of the history chronicle Tarikh-i Ruyan by Awliya Allah Amuli. He died in 1379 and was succeeded by his son Adud al-Dawla Qubad.

References

Sources 
 
 
  

14th-century Baduspanid rulers
1379 deaths
Year of birth unknown